Netball in Botswana is primarily played by women. Girls are introduced to netball at primary schools, as part of the school curriculum.

History
The Botswana Netball Association is the national organization responsible for netball in Botswana. It was founded in the 1970s. It is a member of IFNA and COSANA (Confederation of Southern African Netball Associations).

During the 1970s, netball was offered as a school sport to students attending private international schools.

Men have traditionally served as officials, coaches and administrators for the sport. They also had their own teams. This started to change in the 2000s, with men-only teams having been discontinued in favor of mixed gendered teams.

National competition
Botswana has 30 local graded umpires and 22 locally trained coaches who have been certified by Netball South Africa.

Spar – "Good for You" Netball League is the most important national netball competition in Botswana. Naming rights for the league were given to Spar in 2010. The league is divided into two divisions, north and south. Games for the 2010 season began on May 22. The league championships were held on 27 November 2010 at the BONA Courts in Gaborone.

International competition
Botswana competed in the annual COSANA tournament in 2008.

As of August 2016, the women's national team was ranked number twentieth in the world.

References

Bibliography

External links 
Netball South Africa